is a neighborhood in Shibuya, Tokyo, Japan. Located near Ebisu Station and Daikanyama Station, it houses various luxury boutiques and small stores, as well as sophisticated residences. Although these old names are today largely forgotten, two of them, Nagayatocho and Daikanyamacho, still survive as the name of an elementary school (Nagayato Elementary School) and an official sub-ward neighborhood (Daikanyamachō, Shibuya).

Points of interest in Ebisunishi includes Ebisu Shrine. When the shrine was built is unclear, but thought to be between 113 and 115 AD. Deities to which the shrine is dedicated include Kunitokotachi, Toyokumono, Tsukugui, Ootonobe, Izanagi, and Izanami.

Located in this neighborhood is Himawari Theatre Group, a Japanese theatrical company that specializes in junior actors.

Education

 operates public elementary and junior high schools.

Ebisunishi 1-chome and Ebisunishi 2-chome 1-4 and 6-20 ban are zoned to Nagayato Elementary School (長谷戸小学校). Ebisunishi 2-chome 5 and 21-ban are zoned to Sarugaku Elementary School (猿楽小学校). All of Ebisunishi (1 and 2-chome) is zoned to Hachiyama Junior High School (鉢山中学校).

References

Neighborhoods of Tokyo
Shibuya